Haslip is a surname. Notable people with the surname include:

 Jimmy Haslip (born 1951), American bass player
 Joan Haslip (1912–1994), British author
 Katrina Haslip (1959–1992), American AIDS educator and activist
 Shearman Haslip (1897–1968), English first-class cricketer
 Wilbert Haslip (born 1956), American football running back

See also
 Heslip, surname